Paoli Dam (born 1980) is an Indian actress who started her career with the Bengali television serial Jibon Niye Khela (2003). She then worked in Bengali television serials such as Tithir Atithi and Sonar Harin; the former ran for six years on ETV Bangla.
Dam spent her childhood in Kolkata, earning a postgraduate degree in chemistry from Rajabazar Science College. Initially, she wanted to become a chemical researcher or a pilot.
Her debut Bengali film—Teen Yaari Katha, directed by Sudeshna Roy and Abhijit Guha—began in 2004, but was not released until 2012. Dam's first film release was Agnipariksha, directed by Ravi Kinagi. Between 2006 and 2009, she appeared in five Bengali films, coming into prominence with the 2009 Kaalbela, directed by Goutam Ghose.

In 2011, she received international recognition for her role in the Bengali film Chatrak. The film was screened at the Cannes Film Festival and also at film festivals in Toronto and the U.K. In 2012, Dam made her Bollywood debut in Hate Story and also appeared in Vikram Bhatt's Ankur Arora Murder Case, directed by Sohail Tatari. She won the Viewers' Choice Award for Best Actress for her performance in Natoker Moto at the Hyderabad Bengali Film Festival in 2016.

Early life and education
Dam was born in Kolkata, West Bengal to a Bengali family, which is originally from Faridpur (now in Bangladesh). Her father and mother are Amol and Papiya Dam respectively. She also has a brother, Mainak.

Dam attended Loreto School in Bowbazar, before passing her Higher Secondary Examination. She was a good student, winning scholarships. Dam was admitted to Vidyasagar College, affiliated with the University of Calcutta, graduating with a degree in chemistry. She earned a postgraduate degree in chemistry from the Rajabazar Science College Campus of the University of Calcutta.

She learnt classical dance and was also interested in theater from an early age, but she never aspired to become an actor.

Career

Television career 
Dam began her acting career in Bengali television serials. In 2003, she appeared in Jibon Niye Khela, for Zee Bangla and later in the ETV Bangla serial Tithir Atithi, directed by Jishu Dasgupta; the latter ran for six years. The actress also appeared in Tarpor Chand Uthlo, Sonar Harin and Jaya. Dam has said that she has learned a great deal from Bengali television, and it groomed her for a film career.

Bengali film career

2006–2008
Dam's debut Bengali film Teen Yaari Katha, (directed by Sudeshna Roy and Abhijit Guha), began in 2004, but was not released until 2012. Her first film release was Agnipariksha (2006). The film was directed by Ravi Kinagi and produced by Debendra Kuchar; Dam played a supporting role. The actress next appeared in Tulkalam (2007), directed by Haranath Chakraborty and produced by Pijush Saha. Mithun Chakraborty and Rachana Banerjee played the lead male and female characters, respectively. Dam's third Bengali film release was I Love You, in which she had a supporting role as the heroine's friend. In 2008 the actress appeared in the Bengali film Hochheta Ki, a comedy of errors directed by Basu Chatterjee, in which Dam played a Bengali housewife.

2009–2011 
In 2009 Dam appeared in seven Bengali films, and came into focus with the success of Kaalbela (directed by Goutam Ghose). Based on a Bengali novel by Samaresh Majumdar, the film's background was the Naxalite movement of the 1980s. Dam played Madhabilata, the girlfriend of a young Naxalite leader, and her performance was praised. In its review, The Times of India appreciated: "Pauli, who plays Madhabilata with such integrity that the pain in her eyes and the romance in her voice charms viewers to believe that she has it in her to lend her face to everything that Madhabilita has epitomised". In an interview, Dam said the film was a "turning point" in her career: "Everybody needs a platform Kalbela gave me the platform. I had to prove myself". Her other six films released that year were Hochchheta ki, directed by Basu Chatterjee; Jamai Raja, directed by Swapan Saha; Box No. 1313; Mallick Bari; Shob Charitro Kalponik, directed by Rituparno Ghosh and Tinmurti.

In 2010, Dam appeared in eleven Bengali films, including Tara (directed by Bratya Basu), Takhan Teish (directed by Atanu Ghosh), Moner Manush (directed by Goutam Ghose), Kagojer Bou (directed by Bappaditya Bandyopadhyay) and Banshiwala (directed by Anjan Das); five of the eleven are unreleased. Moner Manush was Dam's second film with Ghose; in this film she played Komli, a Baul. In its review, The Times of India found Dam making "sincere efforts in portraying the role of Kamli". The actress later said in an interview that she learned a great deal from working with Ghose.

In 2011, Dam appeared in Chatrak, directed by the Sri Lankan Vimukthi Jayasundara. The actress played Paoli, a Bengali girl, and the film triggered controversy in India when an explicit unstimulated no-body-double sex scene with Dam and Anubrata Basu was leaked on the Internet.

2012–present 
In 2012, Dam's first Hindi film Hate Story was released; she also appeared in three Bengali films: Bedroom (directed by Mainak Bhaumik), Elar Char Adhyay (directed by Bappaditya Bandyopadhyay) and Teen Yaari Katha (the actress' first film appearance, directed by Sudeshna Roy and Abhijit Guha). Bedrooms story line revolved around the lives of Kolkata urban couples; Dam played Priyanka, a bored and irritable housewife. Elar Char Adhyay was based on Rabindranath Tagore's literary work Char Adhyay, and was set in British Raj India during the 1940s. Dam played Ela, teacher of a group fighting for Indian independence. Her acting was praised; The Indian Express found Dam's characterization of Ela "wonderful" and The Times of India wrote: "Those who thought Paoli's "Hate Story" outing was all about being bold will be pleasantly surprised by her sheer maturity in reinterpreting boldness in the context of an era long left behind". In Teen Yaari Katha, the actress played a supporting role.

Dam also appeared in Mainak Bhaumik's Family Album. The film, also starring Swastika Mukherjee, deals with an MMS scandal.

In 2014, Dam acted in Chaya Manush. In the film, directed by Arindam De, she played Trisha, a journalist. Later that year, Dam acted in Obhishopto Nighty (cursed nighty), directed by Birsa Dasgupta. Dam played the character of Miss Monica, a Bengali bar singer of the 1980s in the comedy-romantic film. Dam said that she was initially reluctant to accept the role, but later realised that it was a "love story". Her next releases were the drama film Sada Canvas and the romantic comedy Hercules, directed by Abhijit Guha and Sudeshna Roy. Dam described her character in Hercules, Minu, as "practical, grounded and not driven by emotions". Her first 2015 release was Anjan Das' Ajana Batash, in which she played Deepa, who works in an ad agency in Kolkata, "lost in depression amongst all the affluence".

Dam's upcoming films include Debesh Chattopadhyay's Natoker Moto - Like a Play which, according to Dam, was a "fictional biopic of a famous actress of the Bengali stage during the 1970s", Auroni Taukhon by Saurav Chakraborty, which is a love story set against the background of communal riots, and Swarup Ghosh's rom-com Tobuo Aparichito.

Bollywood career 

In 2012, Dam made her Bollywood debut in Hate Story, directed by Vivek Agnihotri and produced by Vikram Bhatt. The film had female protagonists; Dam played Kavyah Krishna, a sex worker. In the film, she and her friend Vicky pull off a caper against one of India's biggest business tycoons.

Dam's performance in this film received a lukewarm response. The Times of India in its review:
Paoli Dam doesn't disappoint one bit on the latter aspect, she is not bad in terms of her acting abilities either. She doesn't incite the pathos that one could fervently feel for her character's plight. But though her act is not accomplished, she manages to pull off her role quite well.

After the film's commercial success, producer Vikram Bhatt planned a sequel, in which Dam was replaced by Surveen Chawla.

After Hate Story, Dam appeared in Vikram Bhatt's next film Ankur Arora Murder Case. The film, directed by Sohail Tatari, is based on the true story of a young boy who died in an operating room due to medical negligence. Dam plays a lawyer fighting for justice. In an interview, she described her role: "It's something very real and close to life and it's a de-glamourised role. It's something that I really enjoyed playing". After attending a special screening of the film in Mumbai, Indian film critic and journalist Taran Adarsh called Dam and said that she should work more in Bollywood.

Dam performed an item number in the 2014 comedy-horror film Gang of Ghosts, directed by Satish Kaushik.

Dam is scheduled to appear in the Hindi film Yaara Silly Silly, directed by Subhash Sehgal. , she will also appear in Ashuu Trikha's thriller Jee Jaan Se (with Kay Kay Menon and Raveena Tandon) as a homemaker whose life is shattered after the death of her husband. According to a 25 April 2013 article in The Times of India, after working in two Vikram Bhatt films, Dam has been offered a third (also a thriller).

Other films 
In 2012, Dam began working on the Konkani film Baga Beach, directed by Laxmikant Shetgaonkar. The actress said in an interview: "I like working in different kinds of films. I met Laxmikant Shetgaonkar at the Cannes film festival in 2011 and later heard his script for Baga Beach and liked it. I thought it would be a very unique experience working in a Konkani film. And I thought 15 to 20 days of commitment to a film is not much to give".

Filmography

Television

Web series

Playback singer

References

External links

 
 
 

1980 births
Living people
Actresses from Kolkata
Actresses in Bengali cinema
Actresses in Hindi cinema
Indian film actresses
Indian television actresses
Indian soap opera actresses
21st-century Indian actresses
Bengal Film Journalists' Association Award winners
Vidyasagar College alumni
University of Calcutta alumni
20th-century Indian actresses